Irwin E. Lampert was a Judge of the Provincial Court of New Brunswick, based in Moncton, New Brunswick. He is also a former President of the Canadian Association of Provincial Court Judges.

References

Living people
People from Moncton
Canadian judges
Year of birth missing (living people)